Obscure is a Bengali pop and rock music band from Khulna, Bangladesh. The band was formed in greater Khulna in 1985, by Sayed Hasan Tipu.

History
Sayed Hasan Tipu established the band on 18 March 1985. He is the founder and main vocalist of the band. The first Album Obscure Vol. 1 was released in 1986 and second album Obscure Vol.2 was released in 1987.

Discography
 Obscure – Vol 1 – 1986
 Obscure – Vol 2 – 1988
 Swopnocharini  - 1990
 Ferate Tomay – 2001
 Obscure Unplugged – 2006
 Opekkhay Theko – 2007
 Ichcher Daka Daki – 2009
 Fera - 2013
 Obscure O Bangladesh – 2014
 Majhrate Chad – 2015
 Crack Platoon – 2016
 Stop Genocide – 2017
 Titor Shadhinota - 2019

Band members

Current members
 Sayed Hasan Tipu – Vocal, Founder of Band (1985–present)  
 Sheikh Abir – Guitars, backing vocals, (2018–present)
 MD Arifur Rahman Shanto  – Guitars, backing vocals (2014–present)
 Binod Roy Das – Keyboard (2008–present) 
 Wahidul Mamun Apu – Keyboard, backing vocals (2018–present) 
 Tanvirul Islam Zibon – Drums (2019–present)
 Nadim – Bass (2020–present)
Guest member
 Shawan Mahmud - Vocals

Former members
 Azam Babu – Drums
 Sohel Aziz – Keys
 Tanim – Bass
 Shamim – Drums
 Tushar – Guitars
 John Bala – Guitars
 Tutul - Guitars
 Masud – Bass
 Sohel Alam Chowdhury – Lyricist
 Ahsan – Lyricist
 Shumon Patwary – Guitars
 Liton D Costa – Drums
 Richard – Guitars
 Mehdi – Guitars
 Raajue Sheikh - Bass
 Christofer Prince Gomes - Bass
 Rabbani Mir Rabbi – Drums

Obscure first line-up
 Tipu – Vocals
 Azam Babu – Drums
 Sohel Aziz – Keys
 Tushar – Guitars
 John Bala – Guitars
 Tutul - Guitars
 Masud – Bass
 Sohel Alam Chowdhury – Lyricist
 Ahsan – Lyricist

References

External links
 Official website

Bangladeshi alternative rock groups
Bangladeshi rock music groups
Bangladeshi pop rock music groups